The 2012–13 ISU Short Track Speed Skating World Cup was a multi-race tournament over a season for short track speed skating. The season began on 19 October 2012 and ended on 12 February 2013. The World Cup was organised by the ISU who also ran world cups and championships in speed skating and figure skating.

Calendar

Men

Calgary

Montreal

Nagoya

Shanghai

Sochi

Dresden

Women

Calgary

Montreal

Nagoya

Shanghai

Sochi

Dresden

World Cup standings
* Note – Standings are calculated on the best 6 out of 8 results for the individual distances

Medal table

See also
2013 World Short Track Speed Skating Championships

Notes

References

External links 
 ISU.org World Cup Schedule
 Statistics and current World Cup Standings

2012-13
Isu Short Track Speed Skating World Cup, 2011-12
Isu Short Track Speed Skating World Cup, 2011-12
Short track